Ankavandra is a town and commune in Madagascar. It belongs to the district of Miandrivazo, which is a part of Menabe Region. The population of the commune was estimated to be approximately 11,000 in 2001 commune census.

Ankavandra is served by a local airport. Primary and junior level secondary education are available in town. The majority 50% of the population works in fishing. 25% are farmers, while an additional 20% receives their livelihood from raising livestock. The most important crop is rice, while other important products are sugarcane and cassava.  Services provide employment for 5% of the population.

Ankavandra lies on the Manambolo River, and has a population of estimated at 5000

References and notes 

Populated places in Menabe